Brancaster Staithe is a village on the north coast of the English county of Norfolk. Brancaster Staithe merges with Burnham Deepdale, forming one village.

Brancaster Staithe is in the civil parish of Brancaster, together with Burnham Deepdale and Brancaster itself. The three villages form a more or less continuous settlement along the A149 at the edge of the Brancaster Manor marshland and the Scolt Head Island National Nature Reserve.

Brancaster Staithe merges into Burnham Deepdale.  Although separate villages, the two act as one, sharing facilities.  Brancaster Staithe has the main harbour access, sailing club, sailing school, The White Horse pub & hotel and The Jolly Sailors pub.  Burnham Deepdale has the church, St Mary's, and the majority of the shopping, Deepdale Cafe, Dalegate Market and the tourism accommodation facilities of Deepdale Backpackers & Camping.

Both villages offer accommodation in holiday cottages, hostels, camping, hotels and bed & breakfasts. Village life centres on the harbour and its thriving fishing and sailing community.  The coastal footpath is right on the doorstep, running 47 miles along the North Norfolk Coast.

Etymology 
The origin of the name Brancaster Staithe is unclear, however, several theories have been put forward. The name Brancaster is thought to be a combination of the Latin word "castra", meaning a walled town or Roman station, and "brom", an Old English word meaning a hill where broom grows, in this case probably referring to the furze located on Barrow Common.

History

Amenities 
Brancaster Staithe has a harbour, sailing club, two pubs, sailing school, National Trust activity centre and many other facilities.

References

External links

Brancaster Staithe Guide to this village and the north Norfolk coast.

Villages in Norfolk
Populated coastal places in Norfolk
Brancaster